The Outer Space Act 1986  is an Act of Parliament that implements the United Kingdom's international obligations with respect to space launches and operations by people connected to the country. The act did not come into force until 1 August 1989.

Outline of provisions 
The Act specifies that anyone who launches a space object or carries out any activity in outer space must obtain a licence before doing so. This licence must be granted by the Secretary of state and may contain terms enforceable by prosecution.

Under section 7 a UK Registry of Outer Space Objects is maintained by the UK Space Agency, and is periodically published.

Amendment of the Outer Space Act 1986

In 2015, Section 12 of the Deregulation Act amended the Outer Space Act to ensure licences specify the licensee's liability to indemnify the government regarding space activities authorised by the licence.

The Space Industry Act 2018 extended and improved the regulatory framework for commercial spaceflight activities to be carried out from spaceports in the United Kingdom and launches and other activities overseas by UK entities.

See also
British space programme

References

External links
Full text of the Outer Space Act 1986
The Outer Space Act 1986

Space law in the United Kingdom
United Kingdom Acts of Parliament 1986